Kozluca is a Turkish place name and it may refer to

Kozluca, Burdur a town in the central district of Burdur Province 
Kozluca, Çorum
Kozluca, Harmancık
Kozluca, Hocalar a village in Hocalar district of Afyonkarahisar Province
Kozluca, İliç
Kozluca, İnegöl
Kozluca, Taşova a village in taşova district of Amasya Province